The Type 216 is a submarine design concept announced by Howaldtswerke-Deutsche Werft based on the Type 212/214.

Development
The design is double hulled with two decks, includes a fuel cell, Permasyn motor, and lithium-ion batteries. It is a larger design targeted to meet the needs of the Australian Collins-class submarine replacement project, also known as SEA 1000, and the needs of other countries possibly including India and Canada.  The Royal Australian Navy eventually chose the Shortfin Barracuda, a conventional variant of the French Barracuda-class submarine and no Type 216 was put in production, though this deal was later rescinded.

Successor
The AIP-equipped Type 218SG of the Republic of Singapore Navy is a modified design based on the Type 216. Five submarines were ordered by the Republic of Singapore Navy and the lead vessel RSS Invincible was launched in February 2019, followed by two more launched on 13 December 2022, with another two more under construction.

See also
Submarines of similar comparison
 Type 212 submarine - A class of diesel-electric attack-submarines developed by ThyssenKrupp Marine Systems and exclusively built for the German Navy, the Italian Navy and the Royal Norwegian Navy.
 Type 214 submarine - A class of export-oriented diesel-electric attack-submarines, also developed by ThyssenKrupp Marine Systems and currently operated by the Hellenic Navy, the Portuguese Navy, the Republic of Korea Navy and the Turkish Naval Forces.
 Type 218SG submarine - Now known as Invincible-class, extensively-customised diesel-electric attack-submarines developed by ThyssenKrupp Marine Systems and currently operated by the Republic of Singapore Navy.
  - A class of extensively-customised diesel-electric attack-submarines developed by ThyssenKrupp Marine Systems and currently operated by Israel.
  - A unique class of  diesel-electric attack-submarines developed by ThyssenKrupp Marine Systems and currently being built for Israel.
  - A class of export-oriented diesel-electric attack-submarines, jointly developed by Naval Group and Navantia and currently operated by the Chilean Navy, the Royal Malaysian Navy, the Indian Navy and the Brazilian Navy.
 S-80 Plus submarine - A class of conventionally-powered attack-submarines, currently being built by Navantia for the Spanish Navy.
 KSS-III submarine - A class of diesel-electric attack submarines, built by Daewoo Shipbuilding & Marine Engineering and Hyundai Heavy Industries and operated by the Republic of Korea Navy.
  - A class of diesel-electric attack-submarines, built by Mitsubishi Heavy Industries for the Japan Maritime Self-Defense Force.
  - A class of diesel-electric attack submarines currently being built by Mitsubishi Heavy Industries and Kawasaki Heavy Industries for the Japan Maritime Self-Defense Force
 Type 039A submarine - A class of diesel-electric attack-submarines operated by the People's Liberation Army Navy (China) and being built for the navies of the Royal Thai Navy and the Pakistan Navy.
  - A class of diesel-electric attack-submarines being built for the Russian Navy.

References

Proposed ships
Submarine classes
Submarines of Germany